Sven Heidfeld (born 25 October 1978 in Mönchengladbach, West Germany) is a former auto racing driver. He currently works as a motorsport commentator for the television broadcaster Sky Deutschland. He is the younger brother of the Formula One driver Nick Heidfeld.

Career
His motor racing career included the following achievements:

1988–1996: Karting
1999: 11th German Formula Three Championship
2000: 9th German Formula Three Championship
2001: German Formula Three Championship, 3rd Formula Chrysler Euroseries
2002: 16th German Formula Three Championship
2003: 11th Euro Formula 3000
2004: Euro Formula 3000 (2 races)
2005: German Porsche Carrera Cup

Complete Euro Formula 3000 results
(key) (Races in bold indicate pole position; races in italics indicate fastest lap)

References

External links
 Official website
 

Living people
German racing drivers
Sportspeople from Mönchengladbach
1978 births
German Formula Three Championship drivers
Auto GP drivers
Racing drivers from North Rhine-Westphalia
Opel Team BSR drivers
Draco Racing drivers
Target Racing drivers
Mücke Motorsport drivers
Porsche Carrera Cup Germany drivers